Martina Filjak (born 1978 in Zagreb) is a Croatian concert pianist.

Biography 
Martina Filjak started playing piano at the age of 5 and held her first public performance aged 6. She completed her studies at the Music Academy in Zagreb, the Vienna Conservatoire, the Hochschule für Musik in Hannover and additionally at the Como Piano Academy.

Filjak was awarded the 2007 Concorso Busoni's 5th prize, and subsequently won the 2007 Viotti and 2008 Maria Canals competitions. In addition, she won the Bösendorfer Prize. In 2009  she won the first prize  at the 2009 Cleveland International Piano Competition.

Martina Filjak has performed with esteemed orchestras of her home country and abroad, including The Cleveland Orchestra; the Zagreb, Strasbourg, Morocco, Belgrade and Torino Philharmonics; the Barcelona, Bilbao, Chautauqua, Tenerife, Chile and  Moscow Symphony Orchestras; the Georgian Chamber Orchestra of Ingolstadt, Croatian Chamber Orchestra and the Chamber Orchestra of South Africa under such esteemed conductors  as  Jahja Ling, Christian Zacharias, Heinrich Schiff, Theodor Guschlbauer and Stefan Sanderling. As a recitalist as well as concerto soloist, Ms. Filjak has performed in such major venues as the Concertgebouw in Amsterdam, Konzerthaus Berlin, L'Auditori and Palau de la Música Catalana in Barcelona, Carnegie Hall in New York City, Palais de la musique et des congrès in Strasbourg, Musikverein in Vienna, Shanghai Oriental Art Center and the Severance Hall in Cleveland.

Her New York recital debut at Carnegie Hall in December 2009  received excellent reviews by the New York Times critic Anthony Tommasini praising her 'resourcefulness of her technique and the naturalness of her musicality' and declaring her 'a pianist to watch'. In October 2009 she was additionally awarded an Honorary Medal by the President of the Republic of Croatia for her artistic achievements.

In the 2010 and 2011  she performs  with the Deutsche Radio Philharmonie and Christoph Poppen, at the Al Bustan Festival in Lebanon, the Granada Symphony Orchestra and the Hong Kong Sinfonietta and as a recitalist at the Munich Residenz and at the Palau de la Musica in Barcelona. Future performances include appearances with the Charlotte Symphony Orchestra, The Florida Orchestra, the Boston Philharmonic, the Madrid Symphony Orchestra, the Staatskapelle Weimar and the Granada Symphony Orchestra.

Miss Filjak is a Croatian and Italian nationality and speaks 7 languages.

Discography 
2001 – Album Piano passionato / Tutico Classic
2011 – CD Antonio Soler: Keyboard Sonatas Nos. 1–15 / Martina Filjak, Piano / Naxos 
2013 – CD Robert Schumann: Andante and Variations Op. 46 / Jan Vogler, Christian Poltéra (Cellos), Juho Pohjonen, Martina Filjak (Pianos), Johannes Dengler (Horn) / Sony Classical
2017 – CD Piano: J.S. Bach, Robert Schumann, Alexander Scriabin / Martina Filjak, Piano / Solo Musica

Awards and honors 
 1993 – prize of the Zagreb Philharmonic Orchestra
 1998 – prize of the Jeunesses Musicales Croatia
 2005 – honorary award at the Animato Competition in Paris 
 2007 – 5th prize in the finals of the Ferruccio Busoni International Piano Competition in Bolzano
 2007 – 1st prize at the Viotti International Music Competition in Vercelli 
 2008 – Vladimir Nazor Award (annual award for the year 2007)
 2008 – Milka Trnina Award (for the year 2007)
 2008 – 1st prize and Gold Medal at the Maria Canals International Music Competition in Barcelona
 2008 – Orlando Award at the 59th Dubrovnik Summer Festival  
 2009 – 1st prize & Gold Medal at the Cleveland International Piano Competition
 2009 – Order of the Croatian Interlace for outstanding musical achievements
 2013. – Judita Award for best artistic achievement at the 59th Split Summer Festival

References

External links 
 
Columbia Artists Management – Instrumentalists: Martina Filjak  
The International Keyboard Institute & Festival: Martina Filjak 
Gian Battista Viotti International Music Competition 
Concours International de Musique Maria Canals, Barcelona: Martina Filjak – First Prize
Cleveland International Piano Competition: Past Competition Medalists 
Ferruccio Busoni International Piano Competition
NAXOS: Martina Filjak

Living people
Croatian classical pianists
Women classical pianists
1978 births
Maria Canals International Music Competition prize-winners
Prize-winners of the Ferruccio Busoni International Piano Competition
Musicians from Zagreb
Cleveland International Piano Competition prize-winners
21st-century classical pianists